Salih Idris Kekya (alt. Kekia) is an Eritrean politician. He joined EPLF in 1976 and, since independence, has held the following positions: member of the Central Council of PFDJ, member of the National Assembly, Director of the Office of the President, Ambassador to Sudan, Vice-Minister of Foreign Affairs, Minister of Transport and Communication, and Mayor of the town of Asseb in 2000.

References

Members of the National Assembly (Eritrea)
Eritrean diplomats
1950 births
Living people
Ambassadors of Eritrea to Sudan
People's Front for Democracy and Justice politicians
Government ministers of Eritrea
Mayors of places in Eritrea